Seth Tobocman (born 1958) is a radical comic book artist who has been living in Manhattan's Lower East Side since 1978. Tobocman is best known for his creation of the political comic book anthology World War 3 Illustrated, which he started in 1979 with fellow artist Peter Kuper. He has also been an influential propagandist for the squatting, anti-globalization, and anti-war movements in the United States.  Tobocman's "Edith In Flames. World War 3 Illustrated #45" was listed under "Notable Comics" in The Best American Comics 2015.

Biography 
Tobocman grew up in Cleveland Heights, Ohio; his father was a physics professor at Case Western Reserve University. He grew up reading superhero comics, and his biggest influences, from a storytelling standpoint, were Jack Kirby and Steve Ditko.

Tobocman graduated from Cleveland Heights High School. In 1970 Tobocman and his childhood friend Peter Kuper published their first fanzine, Phanzine, and in 1971 they published G.A.S Lite, the official magazine of the Cleveland Graphic Arts Society. Moving to New York City, he studied at the Pratt Institute (along with Kuper).

Tobocman created an animation for filmmaker Antonino D'Ambrosio's Let Fury Have the Hour (2012), which chronicles the movement of world citizenship.

Tobocman is a member of the radical avant-garde anti-art movement NO!art.

Published work 
 Understanding the Crash with Eric Larsen and Jessica Wehrle (Soft Skull Press, 2010)
 Disaster and Resistance: Comics and Landscapes for the 21st Century (AK PRESS, 2008)
 Portraits of Israelis and Palestinians For My Parents (Soft Skull Press, 2003)
 War in the Neighborhood (Autonomedia, 2000) 
 You Don't Have to Fuck People Over to Survive (Soft Skull Press, 1999) 
 Freedom of the Press in Black and White: The Story of Mumia Abu-Jamal, a Black Reporter (S. Chicago ARA-ABC Zine Distro, 1999)

Contributions 
 The Graphic Canon Volume 2: From "Kubla Khan" to the Brontë Sisters to The Picture of Dorian Gray (Seven Stories Press, 2012) — illustrations for Frederick Douglass's "The Message from Mount Misery"
 Three Cities Against the Wall: Palestinian, Israeli And American Artists Protest in Three Cities (Vox Pop, 2006) 
 Katamine's Forest of Bobo (2006) — concept album, telling the life story of Bobo the bear; each song is accompanied by a drawing in the CD booklet, painted by Tobocman
 World War 3 Illustrated 1980-1988 (AK Press, 1989)

References

Further reading
 Moynihan, Colin. "Ex-Squatter, in a Novel, Details Life on Society's Margins," New York Times (March 26, 2000).
 
 Smith, Chad. "Squatter cartoonist sees parallels with New Orleans," The Villager: A Salute To Volunteers, vol. 75, no. 48 (April 19-25, 2006).
 Worcester, Kenton. Waxing Politick with Seth Tobocman, The Comics Journal #233 (May 11, 2001).

External links

1958 births
Living people
Alternative cartoonists
American comics artists
American comics writers
Artists from Cleveland
Artists from New York City
Jewish American artists
20th-century squatters
Cleveland Heights High School alumni
21st-century American Jews